NK-tumor recognition protein is a protein that in humans is encoded by the NKTR gene.

This gene encodes a membrane-anchored protein with a hydrophobic amino terminal domain and a cyclophilin-like PPIase domain. It is present on the surface of natural killer cells and facilitates their binding to targets. Its expression is regulated by IL2 activation of the cells.

References

Further reading